Smoky Mountain, at  above sea level is a peak in the Albion Mountains of Idaho.

See also

 List of mountains of Idaho
 List of mountain peaks of Idaho
 List of mountain ranges in Idaho

References 

Bureau of Land Management areas in Idaho
Mountains of Cassia County, Idaho
Mountains of Idaho